is a 6-part manga based on the video games Pokémon Mystery Dungeon: Blue Rescue Team and Red Rescue Team that first appeared in Japan's CoroCoro Comic in the fall of 2005. Its English language translation was released in Nintendo Power from the September 2006 issue to the February 2007 issue, presented in the same right-to-left format. After the manga's last volume, Viz Media released the entire English translation of the serial in one book.

Story

The comic tells the adventures of a young, impatient, human boy named Ginji, who transforms into a Torchic, finds himself in a new world, and meets a timid Mudkip who wants to be part of a rescue team. Throughout the comics, Ginji shows a huge desire to become human again. To help Ginji, Mudkip tells him of a Pokémon known as Xatu that can see the future.

As they set off to meet Xatu, they are joined by the Pokémon Gengar who claims that he wants to return a borrowed item from Xatu, but really just wants to steal. As the group scales the mountain to find Xatu, they meet Zapdos. Ginji attempts to fight Zapdos, however he is easily overpowered. The battle is won when Mudkip overcomes his fears and uses Mud Sport on Zapdos to reduce the legendary Pokémon's attack power. Ginji then finishes him off with a close-range Flamethrower. When the team finds Xatu, the Pokémon reveals that Ginji is human, however can only tell him that there is a dark future.

When the team returns to the village, Gengar tells the other Pokémon that Ginji is the cause of the many natural disasters that have been occurring. Gengar claims that years ago, a human touched a tail of Ninetales just for fun. Normally, this would have resulted in a thousand-year curse, however before the human could be cursed, his friend Gardevoir came forward and took the curse instead. Ninetales asked the human if he would save Gardevoir, however the human chose to run away. Ninetales made the prophecy that in one thousand years the reincarnated form of the human would be transformed into a Pokémon and destroy the world.

To find out if he really is that human, Ginji sets out, along with Mudkip. Their journey is interrupted by Moltres, who was turned against Ginji by Gengar. Moltres traps Mudkip on an island in a river of lava and asks Ginji if he would abandon his friend like the human in the story. Ginji uses Sand Attack to escape, but does not actually abandon Mudkip. Instead, he uses his fire powers to send a jet of lava flying at Moltres. While the lava is in midair, Mudkip shoots it with a Water Gun turning it into Moltres' weakness, the attack Rock Slide.

The team continues through the Frosty Forest, where they meet Absol. Absol is wrongly believed to be the cause of disasters and understands Ginji's situation. They are attacked by Articuno, however Absol saves them by talking Articuno out of it. The team finally makes it to Ninetales' cave, where they are attacked by another Pokémon team led by Alakazam. Ginji and Mudkip fight and Alakazam notices that Mudkip has become much braver and stronger. The fight ends when Ninetales appears. He tells them that it is Gengar, not Ginji, who is the reincarnated human turned into a Pokémon and that Ginji was actually turned into a Pokémon to save the world, not destroy it. The natural disasters where a precursor to the awakening of Groudon.

Meanwhile, Gengar uses a Gravelerock to break open the earth and awaken Groudon. Ginji, Mudkip, Alakazam's team, and Ninetales set out to fight it. Gengar saves Mudkip from being buried under falling rocks and feels sorry and a bit hurt that he abandoned Gardevoir. This causes Gengar to join the fight, mentally telling Ninetales that he didn't "run away this time". He is not seen again, presumably killed after using Double-Edge on Groudon. The group is further aided by Absol and the other Pokémon from the village. Groudon is defeated at last and the Pokémon rejoice. In the midst of the celebration, Ginji wakes up as a human in his home. He wonders if it was all just a dream, but then finds his Pokémon team rescue badge. He realizes that Mudkip is much braver now and will always try his best planning. Ginji sets off for school and also vows to try his best.

Differences from source material

Despite being based on the Blue and Red Rescue Team video games, there are noticeable differences between the manga and the video games.

Gengar is not part of any rescue team. In fact, Team Meanies does not exist in the manga; neither does Medicham nor Ekans. He also wants to destroy the Pokémon world for making him a Pokémon as a result of "The Curse of Ninetales".
Ginji does not remain a Pokémon after he saves the Pokémon world, unlike the protagonist (the player) of the video games.
Ginji remembers what it was like when he was a human, also unlike the games' protagonist.
In the games, the protagonist is just simply awakened by his/her partner. In the manga, Ginji is awakened by a small earthquake and Mudkip's cry for help.
Ginji seems to have already become an experienced Pokémon right from the beginning; the video games' protagonist isn't anywhere near experienced upon starting his/her life as a Pokémon.
In the games, the strange frequency of natural disasters in the Pokémon world is caused by an asteroid (called a star by the games' characters) plummeting towards the ground, which ended up being destroyed by Rayquaza. In the manga, the disasters are caused by the awakening of Groudon, who is defeated by the manga's characters.
In the games, Gengar rescues Gardevoir and makes amends for his cold behavior. In the manga, he is possibly killed while battling Groudon.
As a result of the change in the cause of the natural disasters, the final journey to Rayquaza is excised. The battle with Groudon is made the climax instead.

Reception
On Manga-news.com, the staff gave it a rating of 13 out of 20.

References

External links

Pokémon manga
Shōnen manga
Viz Media manga
Shogakukan manga
Pokémon Mystery Dungeon